Belrose is a suburb of Sydney in the state of New South Wales, Australia 19 kilometres north-east of the Sydney central business district in the local government area of Northern Beaches Council. Belrose is also considered to be part of the Forest District, colloquially known as The Forest.

History
Belrose Post Office opened on 4 September 1923 and closed in 1986. Belrose West Post Office opened on 1 July 1969.

The name 'Belrose' is said to be derived from the combination of two plant names – the Christmas Bell and the bush rose, which were predominant in the area.

Demographics
According to the 2016 census of Population, there were 8,780 residents in Belrose. 67.9% of people were born in Australia. The next most common countries of birth were England 7.4%, South Africa 2.4%, China 1.8% and New Zealand 1.8%. 79.4% of people only spoke English at home. Other languages spoken at home included Armenian 3.2% and Mandarin 1.9%. The most common responses for religious affiliation were No Religion 26.3%, Catholic 22.7% and Anglican 21.4%.

Commercial area
Belrose is primarily a residential area, but contains the Austlink Business Park, two shopping centres including Glenrose Village Shopping Centre (formerly Stockland Glenrose). Belrose also has Glen St theatre, and Belrose library.

There is also a Homemakers Supacenta with over 35 shops including established retailers such as Harvey Norman, Nick Scali Furniture, and JB Hi-Fi.

Optus satellite communications facility is located in Belrose, where Optus manages its five satellites currently in orbit.

Schools
Belrose is home to a number of schools:
 Belrose Public School
 Wakehurst Public School
 Covenant Christian School
 Kamaroi Rudolf Steiner School
 John Colet School
 Yanginanook School
 Kambora public school (Davidson)

Parks, sport and recreation
Garigal National Park and Ku-ring-gai Chase National Park are on the northern border.

Playing fields in Belrose include the Lionel Watts Oval, a sporting ground for children, and Frenchs Forest Showground, both on the border with Frenchs Forest.

BTH Raiders is the local soccer club, encompassing Belrose and Terrey Hills. The main oval is Wyatt Oval, but BTH also uses Terrey Hills ovals. More than 900 players are in the local club and it has a vibrant over-35 competition.

The Belrose Eagles are a local rugby league team who play at Lionel Watts Reserve. They play in the Manly-Warringah District Rugby League.

Belrose is home to at least two sets of Tennis courts including; The Belrose Tennis club and Wyatt Reserve tennis courts.

Belrose is also home to the Belrose Bowling club.

Manly-Warringah Radio Society using callsign VK2MB is the local club for Amateur Radio Operators & services the Belrose area, with club rooms nearby at neighbouring Terrey Hills.

Notable residents
 Paul Hogan, comedian and actor, star of movie "Crocodile Dundee" (former resident)
 INXS
 Jason King, rugby league player, Manly Warringah Sea Eagles prop, former Belrose Eagles junior. 
 Lucas Neill, Socceroos Captain, played for the local club, Wakehurst in his youth
 Geoff Toovey, former professional rugby league footballer, Manly Warringah Sea Eagles legend & former head coach, former Belrose Eagles junior.
 Kieran Foran, professional rugby league footballer who currently plays for the New Zealand Warriors.
 David Oldfield, Former Politician, One Nation co-founder.

References

 
Suburbs of Sydney
Northern Beaches Council